Elisabetha (minor planet designation: 412 Elisabetha) is a large main belt asteroid that was discovered by German astronomer Max Wolf on 7 January 1896 in Heidelberg. It may have been named after his mother, Elise Wolf (née Helwerth).

References

External links
 
 

Background asteroids
Elisabetha
Elisabetha
C-type asteroids (SMASS)
18960107